Pristimantis charlottevillensis is a species of frog in the family Strabomantidae.
It is endemic to the island of Tobago in the Republic of Trinidad and Tobago.
Its natural habitat is tropical moist lowland forests where it often utilizes stream side leaf litter and low (forest floor) vegetation. It is chiefly nocturnal.

References

charlottevillensis
Endemic fauna of Trinidad and Tobago
Amphibians of Trinidad and Tobago
Amphibians described in 1995
Taxonomy articles created by Polbot